The 1997 Florida Gators football team represented the University of Florida during the 1997 NCAA Division I-A football season. The season was the eighth for Steve Spurrier as the head coach of the Florida Gators football team.  Spurrier's 1997 Florida Gators finished with a 10–2 overall record and a 6–2 record in the Southeastern Conference (SEC), tying for second place among the six SEC Eastern Division teams.

Schedule

Personnel

Rankings

References

Florida
Florida Gators football seasons
Citrus Bowl champion seasons
Florida Gators football